United Nations Security Council Resolution 360, adopted on 16 August 1974, after recalling previous resolutions and noting that all states have declared their respect for the sovereignty, independence and territorial integrity of the Republic of Cyprus, the Resolution formally records its disapproval of the unilateral military actions taken against it by Turkey.  The Council then urged the parties to comply without delay to their previous resolutions, particularly 353, and then requested the Secretary-General to report back to them as necessary with a view to possibly adopting further measures designed to promote the restoration of peaceful conditions.

The resolution was adopted with 11 votes to none against, with three abstentions from Byelorussian Soviet Socialist Republic, Iraq and Soviet Union.

See also
 Cyprus dispute
 List of United Nations Security Council Resolutions 301 to 400 (1971–1976)
 Turkish invasion of Cyprus

References
Text of the Resolution at undocs.org

External links
 

 0360
 0360
Turkish invasion of Cyprus
 0360
August 1974 events